Petrus Ingenas Lourens 'Piet' Pretorius (born 17 August 1964) is a former South African rugby union player.

Playing career
Pretorius played his provincial rugby for Northern Transvaal and made his debut for the union on 1989. He was a member of the Northern Transvaal team that won the Currie Cup in 1991. Pretorius toured with the Springboks to France and England in 1992. He did not play in any test matches on tour, but played in six tour matches for the Springboks.

See also
List of South Africa national rugby union players – Springbok no. 577

References

1964 births
Living people
South African rugby union players
South Africa international rugby union players
Blue Bulls players
People from Lephalale Local Municipality
Rugby union players from Limpopo
Rugby union flankers